Michael Langhi (born 2 April 1985) is a Brazilian Jiu Jitsu (BJJ) World Championship Champion and World No-Gi Championship Champion.  Langhi is one of a select group of fighters to have won all 4 major Gi Championships more than once – World Championship x3, European Open Championship x6, Pan Jiu-Jitsu Championship x2 and Brazilian Nationals Championship x4.

Langhi began training in 2002 under Rubens Charles at his academy in Sao Carlos. Prior to receiving his Black Belt Langhi was also a multiple World Champion at Blue, Purple and Brown Belt level. In 2009 Langhi was awarded the best Jiu Jitsu Competitor of the year award. Jiu Jitsu talent runs in the family as his brother Michel Langhi is also a multiple IBJJF World Champion.

Langhi retired from competition during the 2019 IBJJF World Championships.

Langhi is widely considered to be one of the best lightweight competitors of all time and he is also recognized globally as an outstanding BJJ Coach having given seminars throughout Brazil and around the World in countries like Finland the UK and Croatia.

He is the CEO at the 13x World Champions Alliance Jiu Jitsu Club in Sao Paulo where he teaches alongside 7th degree Red and Black Belt Mestre Fabio Gurgel and trains alongside numerous multiple world champions.

References

Brazilian practitioners of Brazilian jiu-jitsu
Living people
1985 births
People awarded a black belt in Brazilian jiu-jitsu
World No-Gi Brazilian Jiu-Jitsu Championship medalists
Sportspeople from São Paulo (state)